Francis William Cadell (9 February 1822 – 1879) was a European explorer of Australia, most remembered for opening the Murray River up for transport by steamship and for his activities as a slave trader.

Early life
Cadell was born in Cockenzie, Haddingtonshire, Scotland, the second son of Hew Francis Cadell (ca.1791 – 27 April 1873), mine-owner and shipbuilder of a notable Scottish family.

He first arrived in Australia in January 1849 as captain of the schooner Royal Sovereign, visiting Adelaide, Circular Head and Sydney, sailing in ballast for Singapore in June.

Steaming on the Murray River
In 1850 the South Australian government had offered a bonus of £4,000 to be equally divided between the owners of the first two iron steamers that should successfully navigate the Murray from Goolwa to the junction of the Darling River. When Cadell returned to Australia in 1852, he arrived at Port Adelaide in command of the clipper Queen of Sheba. The government's bonus for the navigation of the Murray River had not been claimed and Cadell stayed in Adelaide, formulating a design for a suitable steamboat in partnership with his father's agent, William Younghusband.

After several delays, on 16 August 1853 his steamer Lady Augusta (named for the wife of Sir Henry Young), commanded by Captain Davidson, successfully passed through the breakers at the mouth of the Murray, and on 25 August left Goolwa, South Australia on a voyage up the Murray with Cadell in command. Among the passengers were the governor, Sir Henry Young and Lady Young, after whom the steamer was named.

A few months later it was ascertained that the Murray was navigable as far as Albury, New South Wales and the Murrumbidgee River navigable to Gundagai. Cadell had carried a considerable quantity of wool and much trade was expected with the Riverina squatters. A gold and silver candelabrum was presented by the settlers to Cadell, with an inscription that it had been presented to him "in commemoration of his first having opened the steam navigation and commerce of the River Murray 1853". Cadell was also presented with a gold medal struck by the Legislative Council, and he joined with William Younghusband, George Young and others in forming the River Murray Steam Navigation Company, whose charter received royal assent in 1854.

Cadell's claim on being the pioneer of inland navigation on the Murray is contested. J. G. and William Randell had constructed an earlier steamer which had traded on the Murray as early as March 1853, and at the time of the Cadell's first voyage upstream on Lady Augusta, Randell's Mary-Ann had progressed further up the river and at a greater speed. Neither of the first two paddle steamers to grace the waters of the Murray River were eligible for the bonus offered by the government. A. T. Saunders was a perennial critic, calling Cadell an "overrated braggart".

Exploration Committee of the Royal Society of Victoria
During 1860 Cadell did exploring work in eastern Gippsland, and attempted to get the Government of Victoria to sponsor the establishment of a steamer service between Melbourne, the Snowy River and the Gippsland Lakes.

Relocation to New Zealand
In 1865 Cadell was in New Zealand employed by the New Zealand government as commandant in the Waikato Steam Transport Service, a support group during the New Zealand Wars.

Cadell ordered the first mate of Sandfly to get underway without its captain. When Marks caught the ship in a row boat, he placed the mate under arrest for taking orders from Cadell. Cadell then ordered Marks to reinstate the mate, and fire another crew member. Marks refused and the crew sided with Marks.

1867 expedition to Northern Australia
 
In February 1867, following the failure of Finniss's settlement at Escape Cliffs, the South Australian government sent Cadell to the Northern Territory "to fix upon a proper site for the survey of ".  His modus operandi was much criticised at the time, for his employment of men from New South Wales rather than experienced South Australians, for choosing the ex-paddle-wheeler Eagle for transport, and for taking few, if any, horses, without which any inland exploration was futile.

He approached the Northern Territory by ship, and his choice of site was influenced by the navigability of the river. He traversed a strait between Elcho Island and the mainland, which Matthew Flinders had previously noted as a probable island.

During the expedition an Aboriginal party-member called Tommy tried to desert three times and was imprisoned on the ship. Tommy reportedly drowned whilst making a fourth escape attempt, although Cadell indicated in a separate report that he had in fact been murdered by other party-members.

Later life and death
During the early 1870s, Cadell became involved in whaling, trading, pearling and blackbirding in North-West Australia. Cadell and others became notorious for their coercion, capture and sale of Aboriginal people as slaves. In 1874 he engaged 10 people at Batavia, described as Malays. In 1875 magistrate Robert Fairbairn was sent to investigate pearling conditions at Shark Bay, following reports that Malays employed by Cadell and Charles Broadhurst were unpaid, unable to return home and some had starved to death. Fairbairn held that Cadell was required to pay the 10 Malays plus an additional 4 months wages as amends for the lack of food, totaling £198. 14s. 4d. They received just £16. 16s. from the sale of Cadell's property at Shark Bay as Cadell had left the Colony of Western Australia some months previously.

Cadell then took up trading in the Dutch East Indies, and when sailing in the Gem to the Kei Islands near New Guinea he was murdered by the cook's mate, about March 1879.

References

Sources

Further reading

External links
The Cadells of Grange and Cockenzie This genealogy site suggests that "Cadell" should properly be pronounced to rhyme with "paddle".

1822 births
1879 deaths
19th-century Scottish businesspeople
Australian explorers
Australian people in whaling
Australian riverboat captains
British people murdered abroad
explorers of South Australia
male murder victims
people from Cockenzie and Port Seton
Scottish explorers
Scottish murder victims
Scottish slave traders